The Kfar Monash Hoard is a hoard of metal objects dated to the Early Bronze Age (the third millennium BCE) found in the spring of 1962 by the agriculturalist Zvi Yizhar in Kfar Monash, Israel. Kfar Monash is located 3.3 km south-east of Tel Hefer (Tell Ishbar) in the Plain of Sharon or in modern terms 9 km/6 mi northeast of Netanya, which is roughly located along the Israeli coast between Netanya and Haifa.

The Monash Hoard consists of:

The Crescentic Axehead was found about 5 years later at about 200m distance.

As of June 2006, the Kfar Monash Hoard was on display in the Israel Museum.

Identification of the 800 Copper Plates 
There has been conflicting ideas to the purpose of the 800 copper plates. Although they have been assumed to be scales of armor from an Egyptian army unit, as proposed by archaeologist Shmuel Yeivin, recent reevaluations have confuted this claim. Archaeologist William A. Ward proposed that the scales were means of barter or a reserve supply of metal from the Syro-Palestinian area. Ward arrived at this conclusion through several pieces of evidence: the scales were not attached to any jacket, body armor was generally not used by the Egyptians until the New Kingdom, copper was still very rare, and the plates were too thin for body armor.

References

Archaeological sites in Israel
Treasure troves of Asia

he:כפר מונש#מטמון כפר מונאש